Kirby Hall is an Elizabethan country house, located near Gretton, Northamptonshire, England. The nearest main town is Corby. One of the great Elizabethan houses of England, Kirby Hall was built for Sir Humphrey Stafford of Blatherwick, beginning in 1570. In 1575 the property was purchased by Sir Christopher Hatton of Holdenby, Lord Chancellor to Queen Elizabeth I. It is a leading and early example of the Elizabethan prodigy house. Construction on the building began in 1570, based on the designs in French architectural pattern books and expanded in the Classical style over the course of the following decades. The house is now in a semi-ruined state with many parts roof-less although the Great Hall and state rooms remain intact. The gardens, with their elaborate "cutwork" design, complete with statues and urns, have been recently restored.

Anne of Denmark stayed at Kirby on 9 August 1605 while her husband King James stayed at Rockingham Castle. King James stayed for three days in August 1616. During a royal progress Esmé Stewart, 3rd Duke of Lennox died at Kirby of the "spotted ague" on 30 July 1624.

The building and gardens are owned by the Earl of Winchilsea, and are managed by English Heritage.

Kirby Hall has been used as a filming location in many productions. These include the following: episode 6 ('Protest and Communication') of Kenneth Clark's Civilisation, and Jane Austen's Mansfield Park and A Christmas Carol for Ealing Studios in 1999. In 2014 it was the venue for an edition of BBC One's Antiques Roadshow.

Images

References

External links

English Heritage : visitor information
Historic England : list entry summary
Teachers' resource kit : English Heritage
Watercolour painted between 1746 & 1800 (British Museum)

Country houses in Northamptonshire
Gardens in Northamptonshire
Tourist attractions in Northamptonshire
English Heritage sites in Northamptonshire
Historic house museums in Northamptonshire
Grade I listed buildings in Northamptonshire
North Northamptonshire